The Celebic languages are a subgroup of the Austronesian languages spoken on the Indonesian island of Sulawesi, formerly called Celebes. Almost all of the languages spoken in the provinces of Central Sulawesi and Southeast Sulawesi belong to the Celebic group. A few Celebic languages (e.g. Wotu, Bonerate) are located in South Sulawesi province. By number of languages (but not by number of speakers), Celebic is the largest subgroup of Austronesian languages on Sulawesi.

Subgrouping

Internal classification 
David Mead (2003a:125) classifies the Celebic languages as follows.

Tomini–Tolitoli
Kaili–Pamona
Wotu–Wolio
 Eastern 
Saluan–Banggai
Southeastern 
Bungku–Tolaki
Muna–Buton

More recently, Zobel (2020) proposed that Kaili–Pamona and Wotu–Wolio form a Kaili–Wolio group, which Zobel places as a primary subgroup of Celebic. Furthermore, in Zobel's (2020) classification, Kaili–Wolio is placed as a sister to group to Tominic–Eastern Celebic, which contains Mead's (2003) Tomini–Tolitoli and Eastern Celebic groups.

Position within Austronesian 
At the current state of research, the Celebic languages are considered to make up a primary branch of the Malayo-Polynesian subgroup within the Austronesian language family.

Proto-Celebic

David Mead (2003a:125) lists the following sound changes for Proto-Celebic and its subgroups.

1. Proto-Malayo-Polynesian to Proto-Celebic
 *C1C2 > *C2 (C1 not nasal)
 *h > Ø
 *d > *r
 *ay, *-ey > *e
 *-aw, *-ew > *o
 *j > *y, Ø

2. Proto-Celebic to Proto-Eastern Celebic
 *e (schwa) > *o
 *-iq > *eq
antepenultimate *a > *o

3. Proto-Eastern Celebic to Proto-Saluan–Banggai
 *-awa- > *oa
 *-b, *-g > *p, *k
 *q > *ʔ

4. Proto-Eastern Celebic to Proto-Southeastern Celebic
 *-w- > Ø
 *s > *s, *h
 *Z > *s
 *ñ > n
 *b > *b, *w

5. Proto-Southeastern Celebic to Proto-Bungku–Tolaki
 *q > *ʔ
 *w- > *h
 *ʀ > Ø initially and contiguous to *i

6. Proto-Southeastern Celebic to Proto-Muna–Buton
 *w > Ø
final consonant loss (?)

See also
Languages of Sulawesi
South Sulawesi languages

References

External links
 Celebic languages at Ethnologue (22nd ed., 2019).
 Classification of Sulawesi languages

 
Malayo-Polynesian languages